"Couple Days Off" is a song performed by Huey Lewis and the News and released as a single from the album Hard at Play in 1991. The single peaked at No. 11 on the US Billboard Hot 100 and No. 4 on the Canadian RPM Top Singles chart, and it reached the top 40 on the charts of Australia, Germany, the Netherlands, and New Zealand. "Couple Days Off" was the band's final top-20 single on the Hot 100.

Track listings
US cassette single and Japanese mini-CD single
 "Couple Days Off" – 4:56
 "Time Ain't Money" – 4:46

7-inch and Australian cassette single
 "Couple Days Off" (short edit) – 3:15
 "Time Ain't Money" – 4:46

12-inch single
A1. "Couple Days Off" (LP version) – 4:57
B1. "Time Ain't Money" – 4:46
B2. "The Heart of Rock & Roll" – 5:01

CD single
 "Couple Days Off" (LP version) – 4:57
 "Time Ain't Money" – 4:46
 "The Heart of Rock & Roll" – 5:01
 "Couple Days Off" (short edit) – 3:15

Charts

Weekly charts

Year-end charts

References

Huey Lewis and the News songs
1991 singles
1991 songs
EMI America Records singles
Songs written by Chris Hayes (musician)
Songs written by Huey Lewis